Niccolò Coscia (1681 – 8 February 1755) was an Italian Roman Catholic cardinal.

He was born at Pietradefusi, near Avellino. In 1725 he was appointed as Cardinal of Santa Maria in Domnica by Pope Benedict XIII, whose secretary he had been when the future pope was Archbishop of Benevento.

Coscia held the effective government of the Papal States during Benedict's reign. He took advantage of his position to commit a long series of financial abuses, causing the ruin of the Papal treasury. According to Montesquieu, "All the money of Rome goes to Benevento... as the Beneventani direct [Benedict's] weakness".

When Benedict died, Coscia fled Rome. In 1731 he was tried, excommunicated and condemned to ten years' imprisonment in Castel Sant'Angelo. However, he managed to have his sentence commuted to a fine. Restored, he took part in the conclaves of 1730 and 1740.

He died in Naples in 1755.

Footnotes

References

External links
 http://www.catholic-hierarchy.org/bishop/bcoscian.html

1681 births
1755 deaths
People from the Province of Avellino
18th-century Italian cardinals
People temporarily excommunicated by the Catholic Church
Conclavists
Deposed cardinals